The Partitio terrarum imperii Romaniae (Latin for "Partition of the lands of the empire of Romania [i.e., the Byzantine Empire]), or Partitio regni Graeci ("Partition of the kingdom of the Greeks"), was a treaty signed among the crusaders after the sack of the Byzantine (Eastern Roman) capital, Constantinople, by the Fourth Crusade in 1204. It established the Latin Empire and arranged the nominal partition of the Byzantine territory among the participants of the Crusade, with the Republic of Venice being the greatest titular beneficiary. However, because the crusaders did not in fact control most of the Empire, local Byzantine Greek nobles established a number of Byzantine successor kingdoms (Empire of Nicaea, Empire of Trebizond, Despotate of Epirus). As a result, much of the crusaders' declared division of the Empire amongst themselves could never be implemented. The Latin Empire established by the treaty would last until 1261, when the Empire of Nicaea reconquered Constantinople, re-establishing the Byzantine Empire. The various crusader principalities in southern Greece and the Aegean archipelago would last much longer, until they were conquered by the Ottomans in the 14th and 15th centuries.

Background
In March 1204, shortly before the sack of Constantinople in April, the Crusaders made a preliminary arrangement on the partition of the Byzantine territories between themselves. This text, concluded between the principal leaders of the Crusade, the Doge of Venice Enrico Dandolo, Marquess Boniface of Montferrat, Count Baldwin of Flanders, and Count Louis I of Blois, has been preserved among the letters of Pope Innocent III. According to its stipulations, the Venetians would retain their previous privileges granted by the Byzantine emperors, and a common committee, composed in equal numbers of Venetians and Crusaders, would elect an emperor for the Latin Empire to be established after the conquest of the city. The Latin Emperor would receive one quarter of all territories, as well as the palaces of Blachernae and Boukoleon in the city. The remaining three quarters of the Byzantine territories would be divided equally between Venice and the other Crusaders. On 9 May, Baldwin of Flanders was elected Latin Emperor, in place of the previous leader of the Crusade, Boniface of Montferrat. According to the Crusader and chronicler Geoffrey of Villehardouin, by previous agreement, Boniface should receive the territories lying beyond the Bosporus and Marmara Sea, "towards Turkey", as well as "the isle of Greece". However, to placate Boniface, Baldwin agreed to assign to him the Kingdom of Thessalonica instead.

The agreement, which was promulgated either in late September or early October 1204 (according to the opinions of W. Heyd, Dionysios Zakythinos, and A. Carile) or (according to Nikolaos Oikonomides) immediately after the sack in April–May 1204, was drafted by a 24-man committee consisting of 12 Venetians and 12 representatives of the other Crusader leaders. The Venetians played a major role in the proceedings, as they had first-hand knowledge of the area, and many of the final text's provisions can be traced to the imperial chrysobull granted to Venice in 1198 by Alexios III Angelos. It gave the Latin Emperor direct control of one fourth of the former Byzantine territory, to Venice three eighths – including three eighths of the city of Constantinople, with Hagia Sophia – and the remaining three eighths were apportioned among the other Crusader chiefs. Through this division, Venice became the chief power in Latin Romania, and the effective power behind the Latin Empire, a fact clearly illustrated by the lofty title its Doge acquired:  ("Lord of a quarter and a half quarter of all of Romania").

The treaty survives in a number of manuscripts, all from Venice: the Liber Albus (fols. 34ff.), the Liber Pactorum (Vol. I, fols. 246ff. and Vol. II, fols. 261ff.), the Codex Sancti Marci 284, folio 3, and the Muratorii codices Ambrosiani I and II. The first critical edition of the treaty was published in the collection of Venetian diplomatic documents compiled by Gottlieb Tafel and Georg Thomas for the Imperial Academy of Sciences in Vienna in 1856, while A. Carile published an up-to-date edition with full commentary in 1965.

Territorial provisions 
According to the treaty's provisions, the territories were divided in the portion of the "Lord Doge and Commune of Venice" (pars domini Ducis et communis Venetiae), the portion of the Latin Emperor (pars domini Imperatoris), and the remainder as the portion of the Crusaders, or "pilgrims" (pars Peregrinorum).

Observations
Based on the forms of the names, the source material for the compilation of the treaty was in Greek, while the prevalence of fiscal terms like episkepsis points to the use of the cadastral and tax registers of the central Byzantine administration.

Several areas are left out of the Partitio. In Europe, the lands of Macedonia and Western Thrace, between the Maritsa and Vardar rivers, as well as the northeastern Peloponnese, Boeotia, and central Euboea, are absent. These were lands assigned to Boniface of Montferrat, and thus evidently excluded from the general partition. This fact also helps to assign the terminus post quem for the treaty, namely the agreement of 16 May 1204 between Boniface and Baldwin of Flanders that established the Kingdom of Thessalonica.

As Zakythinos points out, the territorial division shown in the Partitio and in the 1198 chrysobull for Asia Minor is much more conservative, and reflects far closer the "traditional" thematic structure than in the European provinces. On the other hand, the two documents differ considerably in the extent of territory they mention: the 1198 chrysobull contains the central and northern portions of western Asia Minor, but also the southern shore with Attaleia, Cilicia, and even Antioch, whereas in the Partitio, includes the Black Sea shore from Paphlagonia up to Pavrae.

Effects 
The Partitio Romaniae initiated the period of the history of Greece known as Frankokratia or Latinokratia ("Frankish/Latin rule"), where Catholic West European nobles, mostly from France and Italy, established states on former Byzantine territory and ruled over the mostly Orthodox native Byzantine Greeks. The provisions of the Partitio Romaniae were not fully carried out; much of the Byzantine realm fell into the hands not of the crusaders who had sacked the capital but of the local Byzantine Greek nobles, who established the Byzantine successor states of the Despotate of Epirus, the Empire of Nicaea and the Empire of Trebizond, while the Crusaders also squabbled among themselves. The Latin Empire itself, consisting of the area surrounding Constantinople, Thrace, and the Sea of Marmara was also drawn into a disastrous conflict with the powerful Second Bulgarian Empire. Latin rule became most firmly established and lasted longest in southern Greece (the Principality of Achaea and the Duchy of Athens), as well as the Aegean islands, which came largely under the control of Venice.

Importance as a historical source 
As the division was based on now lost documents and tax registers from the Byzantine imperial chancery, along with Alexios III's 1198 chrysobull, the Partitio Romaniae is a crucial document for the administrative divisions of the Byzantine Empire and the estates of the various Byzantine magnate families , as well as the areas still controlled by the Byzantine central government at the time.

Notes

References

Sources 

 
 
 
 
 
 
 
 
 
 
 
 
 
 
 
 
 
 
 

1200s in the Byzantine Empire
1200s treaties
1204 in Europe
13th century in the Republic of Venice
Byzantine Empire–Republic of Venice relations
Fourth Crusade
Latin Empire
Latin words and phrases
Partition (politics)
Treaties involving territorial changes
Treaties of the Republic of Venice
Venetian period in the history of Greece